The Frank Gomez Memorial Stakes was an American Thoroughbred horse race open to two-year-horses of either sex that was held annually at Calder Race Course in  Miami Gardens, Florida from 1972 through 2013.

History
Inaugurated as the Criterium Stakes, following the December 23, 2007 death of Calder Race Course Hall of Fame trainer Frank Gomez, the race was renamed in his honor.

In 2000, the race became part of the "Summit of Speed" stakes series. In 2013, National Museum of Racing and Hall of Fame inductee and future U. S. Triple Crown winner Mike Smith rode Yes I'm Lucky to victory in what would turn out to be the final running of the Frank Gomez Memorial Stakes. The following year the "Summit of Speed" stakes series was canceled when Calder's racing operations were leased to the Stronach Group, operators of Gulfstream Park, who did not pick up this race when the series resumed in 2015.  

The race was run in two divisions in 1958, 1960 and 1963.

Chronology of race names:
Frank Gomez Memorial Stakes : 2008-2013
Criterium Stakes : 1972-2008

Race distances:
 5.5 furlongs : 1981-1985, 1992-2004, 2010-2013
 6 furlongs : 1979-1980, 1986-1991, 2005-2009
 1 mile (8 furlongs) : 1972-1978

Records
Speed record:
 At 5 ½ furlongs : 104.88 by Devil's Disciple in 2004
 At 6 furlongs : 1:10.67 by in Rummy King in 2005
 At 1 mile (8 furlongs) : 1:38 flat by Champion Du Nord in 1976

Most wins by a jockey:
 3 - Eduardo O. Nunez (1989, 2005, 2012)
 3 - Abel Castellano Jr. (2001, 2002, 2006)

Most wins by a trainer:
 5 - Manuel J. Azpurua (1981, 1994, 1995, 2000, 2003)

Most wins by an owner:
 2 - S. G. Stable (1994, 1995)
 2 - Jacks or Better Farm, Inc. (2002, 2009)
 2 - Trilogy Stable (2006, 2013)
 2 - J. Robert Harris III (2008, 2011)

Winners

References

Ungraded stakes races in the United States
Discontinued horse races
Horse races in Florida
Calder Race Course
Recurring sporting events established in 1972
Recurring events disestablished in 2013
1972 establishments in Florida
2013 disestablishments in Florida